

Events 
April – Clemens Stephani is appointed Kantor at the Lateinschule in Eger.
9 August – Annibale Zoilo joins the Cappella Giulia in Rome
October – Nicolas de La Grotte marries Marie Cipran de St. Cloud
Orlande de Lassus marries Regina Wäckinger, the daughter of a Bavarian court official, in Munich.

Bands formed
Messina Cathedral cappella

Publications

Music
Paolo Aretino –  for five to eight voices (Venice: Girolamo Scotto)
Cyprian Bazylik
 for four voices (Kraków: Matthäus Siebeneicher)
 for four voices (Kraków: Matthäus Siebeneicher)
 for four voices (Kraków: Matthäus Siebeneicher)
Psalm 79.  for four voices (Kraków: Matthäus Siebeneicher)
Psalm 127.  for four voices (Kraków: Matthäus Siebeneicher)
Psalm 129.  for four voices (Kraków: Matthäus Siebeneicher)
Simon Boyleau – Second book of madrigals and canzonas for four voices (Milan: Francesco Moscheni & Cesare Pozzo)
Pierre Cadéac – 3 Masses for four voices (Paris: Le Roy & Ballard)
Pierre Certon
 (Requiem mass) for four voices (Paris: Le Roy & Ballard)
  for four voices (Paris: Le Roy & Ballard)
3 Masses for four voices (Paris: Le Roy & Ballard)
Jacob Clemens non Papa – Seventh book of masses:   for five voices (Leuven: Pierre Phalèse), published posthumously
Giovanni Battista Conforti – First book of ricercars for four voices (Rome: Valerio Dorico)
Claude Goudimel – 3 Masses for four voices (Paris: Le Roy & Ballard)
Clément Janequin –  for four voices (Paris: Le Roy & Ballard)
Jacobus de Kerle –  (Hymns for the whole year following the rite of the Holy Roman Church, and a Magnificat) for four and five voices (Rome: Antoine Barré)
Jean Maillard –  for four voices (Paris: Le Roy & Ballard)
Giaches de Wert –

Theory
Jan Blahoslav – , published in Olomouc, the first book on music theory in Czech
Gioseffo Zarlino –  (Harmonic Foundations)

Classical music

Births 
date unknown – Blasius Ammon, Franciscan friar, singer and composer (died 1590)
probable – Giovanni Bassano, Italian composer and cornettist

Deaths 
July – Georgius Macropedius, dramatist and composer (born c. 1475)
November – Hugh Aston, composer (born c.1485)
December – John Sheppard, singer and composer (born c.1515)
December 29 – Hermann Finck, composer (born 1527)
date unknown – Clément Janequin, composer (born c.1485)

References 

 
Music
16th century in music
Music by year